Parviturbo copiosus is a species of minute sea snail, a marine gastropod mollusk in the family Skeneidae.

Description
The height of the shell attains 1.1 mm, its diameter 1.4 mm

Distribution
This species occurs in the Pacific Ocean, off Panama and Ecuador

References

copiosus
Gastropods described in 1945